Francis Fahy or Frank Fahy may refer to:

 Francis Fahy (songwriter) (1854–1935), Irish nationalist, songwriter and poet
 Frank Fahy (politician) (1879–1953), Irish Fianna Fáil politician
 Frank Fahy (physicist) (1922–2005), Irish physicist and university administrator

See also
 Frank Fahey (disambiguation)